Eric Bhamuza "Scara" Sono (born 1937 – died 1964) was a South African soccer player who ignored the apartheid laws prohibiting people of different races from competing with one another. He captained the Orlando Pirates and was the father of Jomo Sono. He died in a car crash at age 27, when Jomo was age 8.

References

1964 deaths
South African soccer players
Road incident deaths in South Africa
Association football midfielders
Orlando Pirates F.C. players
1937 births